Andreas Skartveit (born 12 January 1937) is a Norwegian journalist, magazine editor and publisher. He was born in Finnøy. He worked for the Norwegian Broadcasting Corporation from 1962 to 1972. He edited the cultural and political magazine Syn og Segn from 1972 to 1978, and was also manager of the publishing house Det Norske Samlaget during the same period. From 1980 to 1990 he was manager of the publishing house Gyldendal Norsk Forlag.

References

1937 births
Living people
People from Finnøy
Norwegian book publishers (people)
Norwegian magazine editors
NRK people